Crockett is a surname of British origin, which derives from the Middle English word "croket", meaning "a large curl"., although some are also derived from the French name "Crocketagne". The name may refer to:

Affion Crockett (born 1974), American actor
Alex Crockett (born 1981), British rugby player
Alexander G. Crockett (1862–1919), American politician
Alvin Crockett (1831–1902), American politician
Andrew Crockett (banker) (1943–2012), British banker
Anne B. Crockett-Stark (born 1942), American politician
Anthony Crockett, (1945–2008), British bishop
Anthony Crockett (soldier) (1756-1838), American soldier and politician
Antony Crockett (born 1956), British doctor
Basil Crockett (1877–1939), British soldier
Bob Crockett (1863–1935), Australian cricket umpire
Charley Crockett (born 1984), American blues, country and Americana musician
Clare Crockett (1982 - 2016), Catholic nun
Cordell Crockett (born 1965), American guitarist
Damarea Crockett (born 1997), American football player
Davey Crockett (baseball) (1875–1961), American baseball player
David Crockett (wrestling) (born 1946), American professional wrestling announcer
Davy Crockett (1786–1836), American frontiersman 
Davy Crockett (outlaw) (1853–1876), American outlaw
Dick Crockett (1915–1979), American actor
Earl C. Crockett (1903–1975), American politician
Effie Crockett (1857–1940), American actress
G. L. Crockett (1928–1967), American singer
George Crockett Jr. (1909–1997), American politician
Henri Crockett (born 1974), American football player
Ingram Crockett (1856–1936), American writer
Ivory Crockett (born 1948), American sprinter
James Crockett (soccer) (1910–1986), American soccer player
James Underwood Crockett (1930–1979), American gardener and television presenter
Jim Crockett (1909-1973), American professional wrestling promoter
Jim Crockett Jr. (1944-2021), American professional wrestling promoter
John Crockett (director) (1918–1987), British stage and television director 
John Crockett (frontiersman) (1754–1794), American frontiersman, soldier, and father of Davy
John McClannahan Crockett (1816–1887), American politician
John Watkins Crockett Jr. (1818–1874), American politician
John Wesley Crockett (1807–1852), American politician
Joseph Crockett (1905–2001), American sport shooter
Juli Crockett (born 1975), American playwright
Kennedy M. Crockett (1920–2001), American diplomat
Larry Crockett (1926–1955), American racing car driver
Linda Crockett (born 1950), American writer
Lucy Herndon Crockett (1914-2002), American novelist
Michael Crockett (born 1983), Australian rugby player
Molly J. Crockett (born 1983), American neuroscientist
Montay Crockett (born 1993), American football player
Ray Crockett (born 1967), American football player
Rita Crockett (born 1957), American volleyball player 
Robert O. Crockett (1881–1955) American politician
S. R. Crockett (1860–1914), British writer
William J. Crockett (1914–1999), American diplomat
Willis Crockett (born 1966), American football player
Wyatt Crockett (born 1983), New Zealand rugby player
Zack Crockett (born 1972), American football player

Fiction
Isaiah Crockett (comics), fictional character in DC Comics
Sonny Crockett, fictional detective in the television series Miami Vice

See also
Crockett (disambiguation)

References

English-language surnames
Surnames of British Isles origin